Junior Senior is a 2017 Indian-Tamil-language stand-up comedy reality TV show, which premiered on 12 February 2017 and 30 July 2017, and aired every Sunday on Zee Tamil.

The show is hosted by Kalyani (previously played by Keerthi). Kollywood actress Meena, actor Shiva, and Tamil television actress Rachitha Mahalakshmi are the judges of the show. Each team has two children (ages 4–14) and two adults (ages 18–25) as the participants. The show last aired on 30 July 2017 and ended with 25 episodes.

Winners

Cast

Hosted
 Kalyani: who had appeared in '"Alli thandha vaanam"' Julie role and some reality shows.
 Keerthi: (Episode: 01–12) who had appeared in Tamil reality shows Maanada Mayilada and Junior Super Star.
 Vignesh Karthick: (Episode - 01) who had appeared in Tamil serial and reality shows Pagal Nilavu, Suriya Vanakkam, Thabaal Petti Enn 8484 and Galatta Kudumbam.

Judges 
 Meena evergreen actress of south Indian films. Yejaman movie female lead role
 Shiva [mirchi shiva] vanakkam Chennai male lead role
 Rachitha well known as Meenachi who had acted in Saravanan Menachi serial actress

Special guest
 Epi: 01 Shiva
 Epi: 01 Deepak Dinkar, Archana, Nanthini
 Epi: 02 Srinivasan
 Epi: 03 Jeeva

Team
 All In All Appatakkars
 Kaipulla Munetra Kalagam
 Sangi Mangi Sangam
 Hawa Hawa Gang
 Kundakka Mandakka Group
 Kabali Khan Club
 Kekraan Mekron Company

Development
On 22 January 2017, the first promo of the show 'Twice the Fun' was released by Zee Tamil on YouTube.

References

Zee Tamil original programming
2017 Tamil-language television series debuts
Tamil-language comedy television series
Tamil-language children's television series
Tamil-language reality television series
Tamil-language television shows
2017 Tamil-language television series endings
Tamil-language stand-up comedy television series